Camille, reine des Volsques (Camilla, Queen of the Volsci) is an opera by the French composer André Campra, first performed at the Académie Royale de Musique (the Paris Opera) on 9 November 1717. It takes the form of a tragédie en musique in a prologue and five acts. The libretto, by Antoine Danchet, is based on Virgil's Aeneid and concerns the Volscian queen Camilla.

Motives from this opera were the inspiration for the 1952 composition La guirlande de Campra, a collaboration between Georges Auric, Arthur Honegger, Francis Poulenc and Germaine Tailleferre from the group Les Six, and by Jean-Yves Daniel-Lesur, Alexis Roland-Manuel and Henri Sauguet. That work was then used for a 1966 ballet of the same name by John Taras.

Further reading
Libretto at "Livres baroques" 
Félix Clément and Pierre Larousse Dictionnaire des Opéras, Paris, 1881

External links

Tragédies en musique
Operas by André Campra
French-language operas
Operas
1717 operas
Operas based on the Aeneid